Emmanuel "Rico" Rodriguez  (17 October 1934 – 4 September 2015), also known as Rico, Reco or El Reco, was a Cuban-born Jamaican ska and reggae trombonist. He recorded with producers such as Karl Pitterson, Prince Buster, and Lloyd Daley. He was known as one of the first ska musicians. Beginning in the 1960s, he worked with The Members, The Specials, Jools Holland, and Paul Young.

Career 

Rodriguez was born in Havana, Cuba, and at an early age moved with his family to Jamaica. He grew up there in Kingston, and was taught to play the trombone by his slightly older schoolmate Don Drummond at the Alpha Boys School. In the 1950s, Rodriguez became a Rastafarian and was closely associated musically to the rasta drummer Count Ossie. 

In 1961 Rodriguez moved to the UK, where he joined live bands such as Georgie Fame's Blue Flames and started to play in reggae bands. Rodriguez also began recording with his own band, Rico's All Stars, and later formed the group Rico and the Rudies, recording the 1969 albums Blow Your Horn and Brixton Cat. In 1976 he recorded the album Man from Wareika under a contract with Island Records. In the late 1970s, he recorded a song called Offshore Banking Business with The Members and with the arrival of the 2 Tone genre, he played with ska revival bands such as The Specials including their single "A Message to You, Rudy".

In 1982, he returned to Jamaica to retire from performing professionally; however, in 1987 he returned to tour with the Heart Beat Band, and between 1992 and 1995 he would also play with Jazz Jamaica, as well as with Linton Kwesi Johnson during this era.

In 1995 Island Records released the album Roots to the Bone, an updated version of Rodriguez's earlier work Man from Wareika. From 1996, among other engagements, he played with Jools Holland's Rhythm and Blues Orchestra and also performed at various ska festivals throughout Europe with his own band. He retired from performing with Jools Holland in 2012.

He was appointed a Member of the Order of the British Empire (MBE) in the 2007 New Year Honours, for services to music. In October 2012 he was awarded the Silver Musgrave Medal by the Institute of Jamaica in recognition of his contribution to Jamaican music.

Death
On 4 September 2015, following a short illness in a London hospital, Rodriguez died aged 80. A tribute to him by Youthsayers alongside Jerry Dammers was performed at the Lambeth Country Show, 2016 to a crowd of 80,000.

Discography

  Reco in Reggae Land (Paying Tribute to Don Drummond), Pama Records (1969)
  Man from Wareika, Island Records (1976)			
  Wareika Dub, Ghetto Rockers (1977)		
  That Man Is Forward, 2 Tone Records (1981)	
  Jama Rico, 2 Tone Records (1982)					
  Rising in the East, Jove Music (1994)		
  Return from Wareika Hill, Alpha Enterprise (1994)		
  You Must Be Crazy (live, as Rico & His Band), Grover Records (1994)	
  Wonderful World, Quattro, (1995)	
  Get Up Your Foot, (as Rico & His Band), Grover Records, (2000)		
  Going West, (as Rico & Friends), Creole Records (2002)			
  Togetherness, (as Rico Rodriguez & Roots to the Bone Band), Subterannia Discos (2005)			
  Japa-Rico - Rico Rodriguez Meets Japan,	Sony Music (2006)			
  Wareika Vibes, Jamdown (2006)

See also
List of reggae musicians
List of ska musicians
List of jazz trombonists
Island Records discography
Ska jazz

References

External links
Rico Rodriguez – unofficial site

 

1934 births
2015 deaths
Members of the Order of the British Empire
Recipients of the Musgrave Medal
Musicians from Kingston, Jamaica
Jamaican reggae musicians
Reggae trombonists
Jamaican ska trombonists
Jamaican Rastafarians
Jamaican emigrants to the United Kingdom
The Specials members
Island Records artists
2 Tone Records artists
People from Havana
Cuban musicians
Jamaican people of Cuban descent
Jools Holland's Rhythm and Blues Orchestra members
The Spatial AKA Orchestra members